A Heist with Markiplier is a 2019 interactive comedy heist television special written and directed by Mark Fischbach, better known by his online pseudonym Markiplier. The film stars Fischbach, as well as Rosanna Pansino, Matthew Patrick, and Chance Morris in major roles. It follows Fischbach on a heist with his assistant (the audience's lens) that goes wrong. If a part of the special is continuous, two end cards will direct viewers to different endings, of which there are 31.

Following the success of Fischbach's previous interactive video A Date with Markiplier in 2017, he wrote the script for the special a year later, although production did not start until 2019. The special was released on YouTube Premium for free on October 30, 2019, and received positive reviews from critics and audiences, who particularly praised the engagement for the audience. Part one of a sequel, In Space With Markiplier, was released on April 4, 2022, while part two was released on May 2, 2022.

Plot 

Markiplier and his assistant break into a museum to steal an ancient box located in a vault. A chain of escapades leads them to obtaining the two keys required to enter the vault. Mark grabs the box, triggering an alarm. Mark gives two escape options: going down a sewer, or using a bomb and escaping from the vault.

Choosing the sewer, they stumble upon a branch leading to two tunnels: a dark or a light one.

After choosing the dark tunnel, Mark repeatedly suggests splitting up to cover more ground. Choosing this option invariably results in Mark's immediate death or disappearance. If the assistant chooses not to split, they and Mark investigate further into a tunnel inhabited by the "Sewer Cult," eventually resulting in the tunnel's destruction, the assistant holding Mark over the enormous pit. If they decide to let him go, the assistant escapes the tunnel, having to cope with Mark's demise. If they hang on, they both fall, Mark using the box's contents, a portable wormhole device, to allow them to escape. The device teleports them through various other timelines of the film before returning them to the start. Additionally, one of the "split up" decisions results in the assistant being confronted by "Darkiplier," who tells them that Mark is a liar, and that he has hidden codes in every ending. Traveling to the light tunnel somehow brings them to the middle of the ocean, resulting either with the assistant being abducted by pirates, or Mark and the assistant being stranded on a deserted island, either being abducted by aliens (Hanson, Avidan) or joining the company of a potential cannibal (Patrick).

If the assistant chooses to use the bomb to escape the vault, they and Mark escape and are presented with two getaway options: a helicopter or a car.

If the assistant chooses the helicopter, they find themselves unable to fly it and are sent to Happy Trails Penitentiary, a rehabilitation-focused prison. The assistant can attempt to gain respect from the guards or the prisoners. If they attempt to suck up to the guards, they find themselves unsuccessful and try to do it on their own. In one of the resulting endings, the box contains a fairy that grants wishes, but is confiscated by a prison guard (Boggs) due to its annoying cries of "Listen!". In another ending, Mark is ambushed by Bubba (Muyskens), an undercover federal marshal, who reveals his true name to be Bob. If the assistant shoots Bob, he takes off a mask to reveal that he was really Wade (Barnes). Mark is then shot by the real Bob, who then reveals that the assistant was also Wade all along. The assistant can also open the box, sending them back in time to the beginning. Briefly investigating a human shaped hole, but deciding against entering reverses the roles of Bob and Wade, and travelling back in time then results in the assistant being interviewed by "Wilford Warfstache". Entering the human-shaped tunnel slowly deforms the assistant, a reference to The Enigma of Amigara Fault. If they attempt to gain the respect of the prisoners, Mark is immediately punched through a wall upon mentioning escaping. A musical number ensues, led by an inmate named Yancy, explaining that none of the prisoners desire to leave. The assistant is then asked if they still wish to do so. If they do not want to leave, they end killing another inmate to ensure that they will receive a life sentence. If they wish to leave, Yancy offers his assistance in their escape.

If the assistant chooses the car, Mark tells the assistant that the car broke down amid a ride. He offers options of walking or fix the car. If they decide to fix the car, a sinkhole separates them. The assistant reaches a cave, where a man named Illinois, resembling Indiana Jones, hands the assistant a cursed monkey statue and asks them to place it on a pedestal. If they refuse to place it, the assistant, seemingly possessed by the statue, attacks Illinois. If they place it, they are both briefly transported to monkey heaven before Illinois leaves them behind.

If they decide to walk, a set of zombies chase them. Unbeknownst to Mark, the assistant is bitten by one of the zombies (Scheid). If they tell the truth, Mark tells them to go away, and the assistant lives with the zombies forever after. Otherwise, they are given a choice between finding a scientist or going to the safety of a nearby fort. At Fort Brannagan, supposedly the only zombie-proof area, Mark and the assistant are inspected for bites by a soldier named Ed (Morris). If the assistant tells the truth about their bite, they are shot. If they don't, it is revealed that the fort has been infiltrated by zombies, and that Ed has been bitten, rigging the fort to explode to prevent the virus' spread. After it explodes, the assistant reveals their bite to Mark. The box is revealed to be the "world's oldest picnic basket," and the assistant is given a choice between two ancient sandwiches: a peanut butter and jelly sandwich (PB&J) or a tuna fish sandwich. If the 2,000-year-old PB&J is eaten, it allows the assistant to turn into a more relaxed zombie, allowing for them to unite humans and zombies. If the 17 AD tuna is eaten, it creates a cure to the zombie virus. At the science lab, the scientist (Pansino) explains that something has caused time and space to warp, intent on destroying the anomaly. She initially believes that the assistant is the anomaly, attempting to kill them to save the fabric of the universe. If they attempt to flee, the assistant is incapacitated and later becomes a zombie, attacking Mark. If they accept their fate for the greater good, Mark takes the bullet for them, only after which it is revealed that the box was the anomaly. As she destroys the box, the branching timeline of the film is briefly shown before collapsing back to the true ending, with Mark and the assistant at the beginning, no longer remembering why they are at the museum.

Cast 
 Mark Fischbach as Mark / Darkiplier / Wilford Warfstache / Illinois / Inmate Yancy / Captain Magnum / Ending Narrator
 Rosanna Pansino as Scientist (Prof. Beauregard)
 Matthew Patrick as the Hermit
 Chance Morris as Soldier Ed
 Gavin Free as Security Guard 1
 Dan Gruchy as Security Guard 2
 Arin Hanson as Alien 1
 Dan Avidan as Alien 2
 Ethan Nestor as Heapass / Zombethan
 Tyler Scheid as Zombyler
 Bob Muyskens as Security Guard 3 / Bob / Bubba
 Wade Barnes as Security Guard 4 / Wade / Wubba
 Mick Lauer as Warden Murder-Slaughter
 Michael Gregory as Bam Bam
 Andrew Gregory as Sparkles McGhee
 Kathryn Knutsen as The Producer
 Jason C. Campbell as Jimmy the Pickle / Pirate Goon
 Bri Marie Korin as Mark Stunt Double
 Holt Boggs as Prison Guard
 Lori Z. Cordova as Prison Processing Guard
 Robert Rexx as Prison Staff
 Mo Alfy as Burning Truck Driver
 Iba Thiam as Guide

Production 
In 2017, Fischbach created an interactive YouTube video, uploaded on Valentine's Day where the viewer could go on a date with him and make choices which affect said date, and can result in one of ten endings. The short gained over 90 million views on the platform, and inspired Fischbach to create A Heist with Markiplier. The line, "You wanna go on that date?," which was spoken in one of the endings of the short, suggests that the events of A Heist with Markiplier take place before A Date with Markiplier.

In late 2018, Fischbach wrote the script for A Heist with Markiplier, which in contrast to the original, had a total of 31 endings. He partnered up with Rooster Teeth to film it, and production was funded by YouTube Premium, who also distributed the special, due to wanting their own interactive-video-project.

Production started in Austin, Texas. Fischbach reprised his role as Mark, and internet personalities Rosanna Pansino, Matthew Patrick and Chance Morris joined the cast in main roles. Filming began in May 2019 and finished in June 2019.

Reception

Critical response 
In a review for the Clark Chronicle, Griselda Eychaner said, "That’s what sets this series apart from everything else on YouTube: it’s made for the viewer. The story is what you decide it should be. And it will go in a completely nonsensical direction no matter what you choose, so you can pretty much do what you want without fear of consequences."

Controversy 
On November 6, 2019, a week after the special was released, Fischbach screened an interactive livestream on YouTube of the movie. Paid subscribers to his channel could navigate the choices of the movie with special emotes of a red paddle and a green paddle. The stream was supposed to be an interactive experience, but YouTube ended up banning hundreds of accounts watching the stream that "spammed" the emotes. It wasn't until nearly an hour and a half into the stream that the moderators noticed the problem.

Many YouTube users, and Fischbach himself, were upset about the situation. Fischbach explained that accounts weren't just getting banned; subscriptions were disappearing, content was being deleted, and it wasn't just YouTube accounts being deleted. Entire Google accounts were being terminated, and many users who filed appeals to get their accounts back had them denied. Eventually the accounts were reinstated.

Eventually, on November 11, 2019, Fischbach released a statement saying that he spoke with YouTube about the issue, and it was being worked on.

Awards and nominations

Sequel 
After the success of A Heist with Markiplier, Fischbach teased the idea of a sequel in a December 2019 interview. He said, "If I do it again, and I might, I would wanna do it in an even better way than I did this time. And I have no idea what that means, and I have no idea how to say that, but, you know, if I did it again I would wanna surpass what I've already made."

In November 2020, after the channel Unus Annus was deleted, he confirmed in the video "Unus Annus - Post Mortem" that a sequel was in development.

After months of updates on writing the project, Fischbach announced that he had travelled back to Austin to film the sequel. On September 3, 2021, Fischbach announced that its title would be In Space with Markiplier. A trailer was released on March 4, 2022.

In Space with Markiplier consists of two parts. Part 1 was released on April 4, 2022, on the same day as the 10th anniversary of the Markiplier channel, and Part 2 was released on May 2, 2022.

Awards and nominations

References

External links 
 
 
 

2019 films
2010s interactive fiction
Interactive films
Films directed by Markiplier
YouTube Premium films
Films shot in Austin, Texas
American heist films
2019 comedy films
2010s heist films
2019 crime films
American crime comedy films
2010s crime comedy films
Rooster Teeth
2010s English-language films
2010s American films